David Charles Douglas (1898–1982) was a historian of the Norman period at the University of Cambridge and University of Oxford. He joined Oxford University in 1963 as Ford's Lecturer in English History, and was the 1939 winner of the James Tait Black Memorial Prize.

Works
 William the Conqueror: The Norman Impact Upon England (May 1964)
 The Normans
 The Norman achievement, 1050-1100
 The Norman fate, 1100-1154
 English scholars, 1660-1730 (1939) winner of the James Tait Black Memorial Prize
 English Historical Documents, v. 2. 1042-1189, (ed. with George W. Greenaway). 1st ed. 1953, 2nd ed. 1981

Notes

References
 Douglas, The Norman Episcopate before the Norman Conquest, Cambridge Historical Journal, Vol. 13, No. 2. (1957), p. 101-115.
 Douglas, William the Conqueror: The Norman Impact Upon England (May 1964) 

1898 births
1982 deaths
British medievalists
James Tait Black Memorial Prize recipients
20th-century English historians